Worcester College  is one of the constituent colleges of the University of Oxford in England. The college was founded in 1714 by the benefaction of Sir Thomas Cookes, 2nd Baronet (1648–1701) of Norgrove, Worcestershire, whose coat of arms was adopted by the College. Its predecessor, Gloucester College, had been an institution of learning on the same site since the late 13th century until the Dissolution of the Monasteries in 1539. Founded as a men's college, Worcester has been coeducational since 1979. The Provost is David Isaac, CBE who took office on 1 July 2021

, Worcester College had a financial endowment of £41.9 million.

Notable alumni of the college include the media mogul Rupert Murdoch, television producer and screenwriter Russell T Davies, US Supreme Court justice Elena Kagan, Fields Medalist Simon Donaldson, and novelist Richard Adams.

Buildings and grounds
The buildings are diverse, especially in the main quadrangle: looking down into the main quadrangle from the entrance through the main building, to the right is an imposing eighteenth century building in the neo-classical style; and to the left a row of medieval buildings known as "the cottages", which are among the oldest residential buildings in Oxford. These cottages are the most substantial surviving part of Gloucester College, Worcester's predecessor on the same site: this was a college for Benedictine monks, founded in 1283 and dissolved with the Dissolution of the Monasteries in about 1539.

After a lapse of 20 years, the buildings of the old Gloucester College were used in the foundation of an academic hall, Gloucester Hall, in around 1560. The penultimate principal, Benjamin Woodroffe, attempted to establish there a 'Greek College' for Greek Orthodox students to come to Oxford, part of a scheme to make ecumenical links with the Church of England. This was a going concern from 1699 to 1705, although only 15 Greeks are recorded as members.

In 1714, thanks to a fortunate benefaction from a Worcestershire baronet, Sir Thomas Cookes, Gloucester Hall was transformed into Worcester College. Even then, there were only sufficient funds to rebuild the Chapel, Hall and Library and the north side of the Front Quad, known as the Terrace. The designs were by Dr. George Clarke, who had consulted Nicholas Hawksmoor.

In 1736, Clarke generously left to the College his great collection of books and manuscripts. These included the papers of his father William Clarke (which are of crucial importance for the history of England during the period of the Commonwealth and Protectorate) and a large proportion of the surviving drawings of Inigo Jones.

Owing to lack of funds, Worcester's eighteenth-century building programme proceeded by fits and starts. The west end of the Terrace and the Provost's Lodgings were added in 1773–1776 (architect: Henry Keene). The medieval cottages were to have been replaced by a further classical range, but survived because money for this purpose was never available; the Hall and Chapel, by James Wyatt, were not completed until the 1770s.

The Chapel
The College Chapel was built in the 18th century. Dr George Clarke, Henry Keene and James Wyatt were responsible for different stages of its lengthy construction (1720–1791), owing to shortage of funds. The interior columns and pilasters, the dome and the delicate foliage plastering are all Wyatt's work. His classical interior was insufficiently emphatic for the tastes of militant Victorian churchmen, and between 1864 and 1866 the chapel was redecorated by William Burges. It is highly unusual and decorative; being predominantly pink, the pews are decorated with carved animals, including kangaroos and whales, and the walls are riotously colourful, and include frescoes of dodos and peacocks. Its stained glass windows were to have been designed by John Everett Millais, but Burges rejected his designs and entrusted the work to Henry Holiday. Oscar Wilde said of the Chapel, "As a piece of simple decorative and beautiful art it is perfect, and the windows very artistic."

The Chapel Choirs
Worcester is unique among the Oxford colleges in that it has not one, but two chapel choirs of equal status, which share out the weekly services between them. There is a mixed-voice choir constituted of auditioned choral scholars and volunteers, which sings twice a week: weekly on Thursday and on alternating Sunday and Monday evenings. The Boys' Choir consists of trebles from Christ Church Cathedral School and alto, tenor and bass choral scholars. This choir also sings twice weekly; on Sunday and Tuesday evenings. These choirs are run on a day-to-day basis by Worcester’s three Organ Scholars alongside the Director of Music.

The Hall
William Burges was commissioned to redecorate the Hall, but was forced to curtail his elaborate designs by a lack of funds. A reduced scheme was completed in 1877 but was substantially altered in the early-twentieth century, and in 1966 Wyatt's designs were restored using his original drawings (preserved in the College Library), under the direction of architect Emil Godfrey. The Hall was refurbished and redecorated in 2018.

Modern buildings
In more recent years, several new residential blocks for undergraduates and graduates have been added, thanks in part to a series of generous benefactions. The latest of these include the Earl Building, Sainsbury Building (which won the Civic Trust Award in 1984), Linbury Building, Canal Building, Ruskin Lane Building (for undergraduates), the Franks Building (for graduates), and the Sultan Nazrin Shah Centre, which won numerous architectural awards and was shortlisted for the 2018 Stirling Prize.

The Canal Building sits next to the north entrance to the college and, as the name suggests, beside the Oxford Canal. It houses 50 students in large en-suite single rooms. The accommodation is usually reserved for third and fourth year undergraduates.

The Gardens

Although Worcester is near the centre of Oxford today, it was on the edge of the city in the eighteenth century.

The gardens have won numerous awards, including the Oxford in Bloom college award every time they have been entered for the competition. Extensive work on the gardens was carried out between 1817 and 1820, and they may have been laid out in the Picturesque style by Richard Greswell in 1827. They are now managed by head gardener Simon Bagnall and a team of seven gardeners.

A production of Twelfth Night was directed by Patrick Garland in the gardens with Oz Clarke as Sir Toby Belch and Francis Matthews. Other garden plays have included The Tempest on the lake, directed by Nevill Coghill in 1949, and Twelfth Night in the Provost's garden, directed by Provost Jonathan Bate and undergraduate Georgia Figgis in 2016.

Gallery

Traditions

Every three years in June, the college hosts a commemoration ball.

The College holds a Formal Hall every day of term except on Mondays, Fridays and Saturdays; dress is formal with gowns compulsory for students who choose to attend. Before each meal, the College grace is recited by a scholar, or student studying a field related to Literae Humaniores. The text is the same as that recited at Christ Church but, in comparison, always given in the long form, in Latin:

Translated into English:

Every Hilary (spring) term on the Saturday of 4th Week, second-year members of the College celebrate 'Midway' to mark the point at which they are exactly halfway through their degree (given that students on 3-year courses attend for nine terms, each of duration eight weeks...). The occasion is marked with the taking of professional photographs: one in formal dress (but not gowns), and the other in costumes made by the students, usually reflecting themes decided by individual groups of friends. Later in the day a meal is served in Formal Hall to distinguish the event.

Sports
Worcester College is known for its sporting prowess, especially in football, cricket and hockey, and is one of the few colleges to have its sporting grounds onsite (football, rugby, tennis, basketball, netball, croquet and cricket). In the 2011/2012 season Worcester won Men's Football Cuppers, Men's Reserve Football Cuppers and Women's Football Cuppers. During recent years the hockey side has won numerous league titles, 'Varsity Cuppers' or 'Supercuppers' in 2015, and Cuppers in 2016.. 
The Worcester College Boat Club was founded in 1825 and shares the boathouse building with Merton College Boat Club.

People associated with Worcester

Provosts

 Richard Blechinden, 1714–1736
 William Gower, 1736–1777
 William Sheffield, 1777–1795
 Whittington Landon, 1795–1839
 Richard Lynch Cotton, 1839–1881
 William Inge, 1881–1903
 Charles Henry Olive Daniel, 1903–1919
 Francis John Lys, 1919–1946
 John Cecil Masterman, 1946–1962
 Oliver Franks, Baron Franks, 1962–1976
 Asa Briggs, Baron Briggs, 1976–1991
 Richard Smethurst, 1991–2011
 Sir Jonathan Bate, 2011–2019
 Kate Tunstall, Interim Provost 2019–21
 David Isaac, from 1 July 2021–

Fellows

Notable alumni

Fictional alumni of the college include Nick Guest from The Line of Beauty by Alan Hollinghurst.

See also
 Bromsgrove School that shares a similar coat of arms, based on those of their joint benefactor, Sir Thomas Cookes of Norgrove.

References

Sources

External links

 Worcester College homepage
 Worcester College JCR
 Worcester College MCR
 Worcester College Chapel
 

 
1714 establishments in England
Educational institutions established in 1714
Colleges of the University of Oxford
Grade I listed buildings in Oxford
Grade I listed educational buildings
Buildings and structures of the University of Oxford
William Burges buildings